Eftsoons is an album by American avant-garde jazz composer, bandleader, and multi-instrumentalist Hal Russell with Mars Williams recorded in 1981 and originally released on the Nessa label.

Reception

The Allmusic review awarded the album three stars.

Track listing
All compositions by Hal Russell and Mars Williams
 "Carnal Concupiscence" - 3:24
 "Is This Virginia?" - 4:49
 "A Sync/Sync Stat Mux Prolithux" - 4:52
 "Odoriferous Flambeaus of the Paranymphs" - 8:25
 "N, SSS, EEE <RETURN>" - 7:05
 "Eftsoons" - 8:43
 "Noise Commands: Blast 1" - 5:06

Personnel
Hal Russell - C melody saxophone, cornet, vibraphone, drums, toy horns and much else
Mars Williams - tenor saxophone, slide whistle bells, newspapers and much else

References

Hal Russell albums
Mars Williams albums
1984 albums
Nessa Records albums